Joakim Claes Lindström (born December 5, 1983) is a Swedish professional ice hockey winger currently playing for Skellefteå AIK of the Swedish Hockey League. Lindström has previously played in the National Hockey League (NHL) for the Columbus Blue Jackets, Phoenix Coyotes, Colorado Avalanche, St. Louis Blues and, most recently, for the Toronto Maple Leafs. He was drafted in the second round, 41st overall, by Columbus in 2002.

Playing career
Lindström came through the youth ranks of Skellefteå AIK, before joining the Modo Hockey youth program. He logged his first minutes in the country's top-flight Swedish Hockey League for Modo during the 2000-01 season.

He was drafted 41st overall in the 2002 NHL Entry Draft by the Columbus Blue Jackets. After spending five years in the Elitserien with Modo, Lindström made his North American debut with the latter stages of the 2004–05 season with the Syracuse Crunch, the top minor league affiliate of the Blue Jackets in the American Hockey League (AHL).

Lindström made his NHL debut the following season, 2005–06, with the Blue Jackets and played in a further 37 games with Columbus before he was traded to the Anaheim Ducks for a conditional draft pick on July 15, 2008.

On October 3, 2008, Lindström was claimed off waivers by the Chicago Blackhawks, but was consequently re-claimed back by the Ducks on October 7, 2008. He was then assigned to the Ducks' top affiliate, the Iowa Chops, of the AHL.

On December 3, 2008, the Ducks traded Lindström to the Phoenix Coyotes in exchange for Logan Stephenson. Lindström was recalled by Phoenix on December 8, 2008, and made his Coyotes debut in a 5–3 win over the Dallas Stars on December 10, 2008.

Lindström was not re-signed by the Coyotes at season's end, and on July 13, 2009, he left North America and signed a one-year contract with Russian team Torpedo Nizhny Novgorod of the Kontinental Hockey League (KHL). In the 2009–10 season, he led the club with 20 assists and scored 30 points, though Torpedo failed to qualify for the post-season.

On May 18, 2010, Lindström returned to the Elitserien, signing with Skellefteå AIK for the 2010–11 season. In 54 games, he scored 60 points to lead the League in scoring as AIK finished as silver medalists in the playoffs. He was also selected to the Elitserien All-Star Team.

On June 15, 2011, Lindström signed a one-year contract to return to the NHL with the Colorado Avalanche. On November 29, 2011, however, Lindström was waived by the Avalanche, whereupon he returned to Skellefteå AIK in Sweden.

On May 28, 2014, after helping Skellefteå to a second consecutive title and being selected as the Swedish Hockey League's MVP, Lindström signed a one-year free agent contract with the St. Louis Blues, marking a third attempt to establish himself within the NHL. In the 2014–15 season, Lindström made the Blues' opening night roster, but was unable to secure a top six position on the Blues' scoring lines. Primarily used as a depth player, Lindström contributed with three goals in 34 games before on March 2, 2015, he was traded by the Blues to the Toronto Maple Leafs, along with a conditional draft pick (Nicolas Mattinen), in exchange for Olli Jokinen.

Lindström's stint in Toronto would be short, as he signed a one-year contract with SKA Saint Petersburg of the KHL shortly after the regular season ended on May 1, 2015. He left Saint Petersburg after the 2015–16 season and signed to return to Skellefteå AIK on April 27, 2016.

International play

Lindström earned his first caps for Sweden during the 2009–10 season and played at the 2014 and 2015 World Championships.

During the 2017–18 season, with the exclusion of NHL contracted players, Lindström was selected to represent Sweden at the 2018 Winter Olympics in Pyeongchang, South Korea. Used in a scoring role, he finished scoreless through 4 games in a fifth place finish.

Career statistics

Regular season and playoffs

International

Awards and honours

References

External links

1983 births
Living people
Colorado Avalanche players
Columbus Blue Jackets draft picks
Columbus Blue Jackets players
Expatriate ice hockey players in Russia
IF Sundsvall Hockey players
Iowa Stars players
Modo Hockey players
People from Skellefteå Municipality
Phoenix Coyotes players
St. Louis Blues players
San Antonio Rampage players
SKA Saint Petersburg players
Skellefteå AIK players
Swedish expatriate sportspeople in Russia
Swedish expatriate ice hockey players in the United States
Swedish ice hockey forwards
Syracuse Crunch players
Toronto Maple Leafs players
Torpedo Nizhny Novgorod players
Ice hockey players at the 2018 Winter Olympics
Olympic ice hockey players of Sweden
Sportspeople from Västerbotten County